The Kafue mole-rat (Fukomys kafuensis) is a species of rodent in the family Bathyergidae. It is endemic to Zambia. Its natural habitat is moist savanna.

References

Woods, C. A. and C. W. Kilpatrick. 2005.  pp 1538–1600 in Mammal Species of the World a Taxonomic and Geographic Reference 3rd ed. D. E. Wilson and D. M. Reeder eds. Smithsonian Institution Press, Washington D.C.

Fukomys
Mammals of Zambia
Endemic fauna of Zambia
Mammals described in 1999
Taxonomy articles created by Polbot